Hanna Thompson (born November 1, 1983 in Rochester, New York) is an American foil fencer who was a member of the 2008 Olympics U.S. Women's foil team, which won the silver medal.

A 2006 graduate of Ohio State University, Thompson was a four-time NCAA All-America and helped the Buckeyes capture the 2004 NCAA National Championship. Thompson also placed third individually at the NCAA Championships in 2002 and 2004 and helped Ohio State capture four consecutive Midwest Championship titles.

Thompson has also competed with six national teams and two junior squads, earning a third-place team medal at the 2003 Junior World Championships in Trapani, Italy. In 2005, she won a Senior National Championship with the Rochester Fencing Club and also helped that squad bring in five senior team titles.

Thompson served as a volunteer assistant coach at Ohio State from 2005–07 and assistant coach at Duke from 2009-2010.

She graduated from Golden Gate University law school and passed the State Bar of California in 2013, and the State Bar of Hawaii in 2015. She currently works as a litigator.

Competition record
 2008 - Member of the U.S. Olympic Team, Beijing, China
 2007 - Pan American Games, Rio de Janeiro, Brazil - silver medal individual
 2005 - National Champion

References

American female foil fencers
Fencers at the 2007 Pan American Games
Fencers at the 2008 Summer Olympics
Olympic silver medalists for the United States in fencing
Sportspeople from Rochester, New York
1983 births
Living people
Medalists at the 2008 Summer Olympics
Pan American Games silver medalists for the United States
Pan American Games medalists in fencing
Golden Gate University School of Law alumni
Medalists at the 2007 Pan American Games
21st-century American women
American female sabre fencers